Jaime is a Portuguese medium-length documentary film, directed by António Reis and released in 1974. Its subject is  the life of Jaime Fernandes, an artist and patient of the psychiatric Hospital Miguel Bombarda in Lisbon.In the words of António Reis, Jaime "is not a story, but it is a film where everything matters".

References

External links
 

1974 drama films
1974 films
Films directed by António Reis
Portuguese drama films
1970s Portuguese-language films